An off-Broadway theatre is any professional theatre venue in New York City with a seating capacity between 100 and 499, inclusive. These theatres are smaller than Broadway theatres, but larger than off-off-Broadway theatres, which seat fewer than 100.

An "off-Broadway production" is a production of a play, musical, or revue that appears in such a venue and adheres to related trade union and other contracts. Some shows that premiere off-Broadway are subsequently produced on Broadway.

History 
The term originally referred to any venue, and its productions, on a street intersecting Broadway in Midtown Manhattan's Theater District, the hub of the American theatre industry. It later became defined by the League of Off-Broadway Theatres and Producers as a professional venue in Manhattan with a seating capacity of at least 100, but not more than 499, or a production that appears in such a venue and adheres to related trade union and other contracts.

Previously, regardless of the size of the venue, a theatre was considered a Broadway (rather than off-Broadway) house if it was within the "Broadway Box", extending from 40th Street north to 54th Street and from Sixth Avenue west to Eighth Avenue, including Times Square and West 42nd Street. This change to the contractual definition of "off-Broadway" benefited theatres satisfying the 499-seat criterion because of the lower minimum required salary for Actors' Equity performers at Off-Broadway theatres as compared with the salary requirements of the union for Broadway theatres. The adoption of the 499-seat criterion occurred after a one-day strike in January 1974. Examples of off-Broadway theatres within the Broadway Box are the Laura Pels Theatre and The Theater Center.

The off-Broadway movement started in the 1950s as a reaction to the perceived commercialism of Broadway and provided less expensive venues for shows that have employed many future Broadway artists. An early success was Circle in the Square Theatre's 1952 production of Summer and Smoke by Tennessee Williams. According to theatre historians Ken Bloom and Frank Vlastnik, Off-Broadway offered a new outlet for "poets, playwrights, actors, songwriters, and designers. ... The first great Off-Broadway musical was the 1954 revival" of The Threepenny Opera, which proved that off-Broadway productions could be financially successful. Theatre Row, on West 42nd Street between 9th and 10th Avenues in Manhattan, is a concentration of off-Broadway and off-off-Broadway theatres. It was developed in the mid-1970s and modernized in 2002.

Many off-Broadway shows have had subsequent runs on Broadway, including such successful musicals as Hair, Godspell, Little Shop of Horrors, Sunday in the Park with George, Rent, Grey Gardens, Urinetown, Avenue Q, The 25th Annual Putnam County Spelling Bee, Rock of Ages, In the Heights, Spring Awakening, Next to Normal, Hedwig and the Angry Inch, Fun Home, Hamilton, Dear Evan Hansen, and Hadestown. In particular, two that became Broadway hits, Grease and A Chorus Line, encouraged other producers to premiere their shows off-Broadway. Plays that have moved from off-Broadway houses to Broadway include Doubt, I Am My Own Wife, Bridge & Tunnel, The Normal Heart, and Coastal Disturbances. Other productions, such as Stomp, Blue Man Group, Altar Boyz, Perfect Crime, Forbidden Broadway, Nunsense, Naked Boys Singing, Bat Boy: The Musical, and I Love You, You're Perfect, Now Change have had runs of many years off-Broadway, never moving to Broadway. The Fantasticks, the longest-running musical in theatre history, spent its original 42-year run off-Broadway and began another long off-Broadway run in 2006.

Awards
Off-Broadway shows, performers, and creative staff are eligible for the following awards: the New York Drama Critics' Circle Award, the Outer Critics Circle Award, the Drama Desk Award, the Obie Award (presented since 1956 by The Village Voice), the Lucille Lortel Award (created in 1985 by the League of Off-Broadway Theatres & Producers), and the Drama League Award.  Although off-Broadway shows are not eligible for Tony Awards, an exception was made in 1956 (before the rules were changed), when Lotte Lenya won Best Performance by a Featured Actress in a Musical for the off-Broadway production of The Threepenny Opera.

List of off-Broadway theatres 
Capacity is based on the capacity given for the respective theatre at the Internet Off-Broadway Database.

See also

 Little Theatre Movement
 Little Theatre Guild of Great Britain
 Off-Off-Broadway

References

External links 
 Internet Off-Broadway Database
The League of Off-Broadway Theatres and Producers

 
Broadway theatre
Culture of New York City
Theatre in the United States